Claudina Villaurrutia (born 17 May 1955) is a Cuban volleyball player. She competed at the 1972 Summer Olympics and the 1976 Summer Olympics.

References

External links
 

1955 births
Living people
Cuban women's volleyball players
Olympic volleyball players of Cuba
Volleyball players at the 1972 Summer Olympics
Volleyball players at the 1976 Summer Olympics
Place of birth missing (living people)
Pan American Games medalists in volleyball
Pan American Games gold medalists for Cuba
Medalists at the 1975 Pan American Games
20th-century Cuban women